B-cell maturation antigen (BCMA or BCM), also known as tumor necrosis factor receptor superfamily member 17 (TNFRSF17), is a protein that in humans is encoded by the TNFRSF17 gene.

TNFRSF17 is a cell surface receptor of the TNF receptor superfamily which recognizes B-cell activating factor (BAFF).

Serum B-cell maturation antigen (sBCMA) is the cleaved form of BCMA, found at low levels in the serum of normal patients and generally elevated in patients with multiple myeloma (MM).

Function 
The protein encoded by this gene is a member of the TNF-receptor superfamily. This receptor is preferentially expressed in mature B lymphocytes, and may be important for B cell development and autoimmune response. This receptor has been shown to specifically bind to the tumor necrosis factor (ligand) superfamily, member 13b (TNFSF13B/TALL-1/BAFF), and to lead to NF-kappaB and MAPK8/JNK activation. This receptor also binds to various TRAF family members, and thus may transduce signals for cell survival and proliferation.

Interactions 

TNFRSF17 has been shown to interact with the B-cell activating factor TNFSF13B. A conserved domain at the N-terminus, BCMA TALL-1 binding domain, is required for binding to the TNFSF13B.

Clinical significance 

TNFRSF17 is implicated in leukemia, lymphomas, and multiple myeloma (see the "Mitelman Database"  and the Atlas of Genetics and Cytogenetics in Oncology and Haematology,).

As a drug target 
An antibody-drug conjugate Belantamab mafodotin (GSK2857916) has evaluated in patients with relapsed/refractory multiple myeloma. Belantamab mafodotin  was approved in the United States in August 2020 for the treatment of  patients with relapsed or refractory multiple myeloma who have received at least four prior therapies.

A Phase 1b/2 study of JNJ-4528, a CAR-T cell therapy directed against BCMA in myeloma patients refractory to a proteasome inhibitor or immunomodulatory drug, and who had received an anti-CD38 antibody has been completed.

ALLO-715 is a CAR-T therapy by Allogene Therapeutics that targets B-cell maturation antigen (BCMA). , it is undergoing clinical trials for the treatment of multiple myeloma. On 21 April 2021, the FDA granted Regenerative Medicine Advanced Therapy status to ALLO-715. ALLO-715 is being investigated at Memorial Sloan Kettering Cancer Center and the Mayo Clinic as part of the UNIVERSAL trial for multiple myeloma, on its own and in conjunction with the selective gamma secretase inhibitor nirogacestat.

References

External links

Further reading 

 
 
 
 
 
 
 
 
 
 
 
 
 
 
 

Protein domains
Clusters of differentiation
TNF receptor family